Hu Hanmin (born in Panyu, Guangdong, Qing Dynasty, China, 9 December 1879 – Kwangtung, Republic of China, 12 May 1936) was a  Chinese philosopher and politician who was one of the early conservative right-wing faction leaders in the Kuomintang (KMT) during revolutionary China.

Biography
Hu was of Hakka descent from Ji'an, Jiangxi. Trần Xuân Sinh claimed that Hu Hanmin could be the descendant of Hồ Hán Thương, the second monarch of the Hồ dynasty of Vietnam.  His father had moved to Panyu, Guangdong, to take up an official post.

He qualified as a Juren at the age of 21. He studied in Japan from 1902 and joined the Tongmenghui (Chinese Revolutionary Alliance) in 1905 as editor of the newspaper Min Bao. From 1907 to 1910 he took part in several armed revolutions. Shortly after the Xinhai Revolution in 1911, he was appointed Governor of Guangdong and Chief Secretary of the Provisional Government. He took part in the Second Revolution of 1913 and, after its failure, followed Sun Yat-sen to Japan. There they founded the Kuomintang (Chinese Nationalist Party). Hu lived in Guangdong from 1917 to 1921 and worked for Sun Yat-sen, first as Minister of Transport and later as Chief Adviser.

Hu Hanmin visited Kemalist Turkey and was greatly inspired by the revolutionary nationalist ideals of Kemalism. Hu hoped that Chiang would model his republic on Atatürk's, with limited military involvement in politics.

Hu was elected to the Central Executive Committee at the Kuomintang's first conference in January 1924. In September he acted as vice-generalissimo when Sun Yat-sen left Guangzhou for Shaoguan. Sun died in Beijing in March 1925, and Hu was one of the three most powerful figures in the Kuomintang. The other two were Wang Jingwei and Liao Zhongkai. Liao was assassinated in August that year, and Hu was suspected and arrested. After the Ninghan split in 1927, Hu supported Chiang Kai-shek and was head of the Legislative Yuan in Nanjing.

Later, on 28 February 1931, Hu was placed under house arrest by Chiang because of disputes over the new Provisional Constitution.  Internal party pressure forced Chiang to release him. Hu then became a powerful leader in South China, advocating three political principles: resistance to Japanese invasion, resistance to warlords, and resistance to the self-proclaimed leader Chiang Kai-shek. The anti-Chiang factions in the KMT gathered in Guangzhou to set up a rival government.  They demanded Chiang's resignation from his dual post of president and premier.  Civil war was averted by the Japanese invasion of Manchuria.  Hu continued to rule southern China, the heartland of the KMT, with the help of Chen Jitang and the New Guangxi clique.  There he tried to create a model government, free of corruption and cronyism, to discredit Chiang's Nanjing regime.

Hu was an advocate of action against Japanese aggression, criticising Chiang Kai-shek for "his spineless failure to adopt a strong policy towards the foreign power which has torn and ravaged our homeland!"

Hu visited Europe and ceased his political attack on Chiang Kai-shek in June 1935. At the first session of the Kuomintang's Fifth Conference in December 1935, he was elected Chairman of the Central Committee for Common Affairs in absentia. Hu returned to China in January 1936 and lived in Guangzhou until he died of a cerebral haemorrhage on 12 May 1936.

His death sparked a crisis. Chiang wanted to replace Hu with loyalists in southern China and end the autonomy the south had enjoyed under Hu. In response, Chen and the New Guangxi clique conspired to remove Chiang from office.  In the so-called "Liangguang Incident", Chen was forced to resign as governor of Guangdong after Chiang bribed many of Chen's officers to defect and the conspiracy collapsed.

Hu's political philosophy was that one's individual rights were a function of one's membership of a nation.

References

External links
 
 Hu Han-ming (Hu Hanmin) 胡漢民 from Biographies of Prominent Chinese c.1925.

Chinese revolutionaries
1879 births
1936 deaths
Comintern people
Hakka politicians
Members of the Kuomintang
People from Panyu District
People of the 1911 Revolution
Political philosophers
Politicians from Guangzhou
Presidents of the Legislative Yuan
Tongmenghui members